HMS Spiraea was a  of the British Royal Navy. Named for a genus of shrub, Spiraea served in the Second World War as an escort.

The corvette was launched on 31 October 1940 at Glasgow, Scotland and entered nominal service on 27 February 1941.

Fate
Spiraea was sold to Greece in August 1945 and became the Thessaloniki.

References

 
 Helgason Helgason (2009), HMS Spiraea (K 08): Corvette of the Flower class, uboat.net. Retrieved 23 July 2009.

 

Flower-class corvettes of the Royal Navy
1940 ships
Ships built by Harland and Wolff